Styloichthys (Greek: stylo "pillar" and ichthys "fish"; "Pillar fish") is a prehistoric sarcopterygian, lobe-finned fish which lived during the Early Devonian (Lochkovian) period of East Yunnan, South China.

Because it is clear that the jaws and skull of Styloichthys share many derived features with coelacanthiformes it is placed as the oldest coelacanth.

Description
Styloichthys is characterized by large pores on the cosmine surface. These pores are often spoon-shaped and arranged in parallel grooves. There is a jagged margin between ethmosphenoid and otoccipital shields, an otoccipital with a wide flat surface carrying no vestibular fontanelle.

The snout bends sharply downward and is slightly concave. The lower jaw has a ventrally protruding flange formed by prearticular and meckelian bone.

Also characteristic of Styloichthys is the lyre-shaped trajectory of the supraorbital canal, a fenestra ventralis, small internasal cavities, three coronoids in the lower jaw, an eyestalk and a slender postorbital pila which connects the basipterygoid process and the side of the braincase wall.

Anatomical characteristics

Orbit region 
The feature exceptional of Styloichthys is the recessed teardrop-shaped eyestalk area behind the optic canal.

The well defined natural margin of this unfinished area is indicated by surrounding periosteal lining which dips slightly into the unfinished recess. This corresponds to the eyestalk attachment reported in basal bony fishes.

A small depression serves for eye muscle attachment ventral to the eyestalk area.

Lower Jaw
Indication of three semilunar pockets along a shallow groove between the dentary and the prearticular shows that the lower jaw has three coronoids. It is unique in that it has a very large adductor fossa, a convex ventral flange, and a prearticular of minute denticles dorsally and undulating parallel ridges ventrally.

References

External links
 Styloichthys at Palaeos
 A primitive fish close to the common ancestor of tetrapods and lungfish
 

Prehistoric animals of China
Prehistoric lobe-finned fish genera
Early Devonian fish
Devonian bony fish
Fossil taxa described in 2001